The Excursionist ("Excursion Girl") is a 2013 Lithuanian film that dramatizes the story of an eleven-year old Lithuanian girl Marija who escapes from a Soviet deportation to Siberia. The plot is loosely based on a real-life story published in Komjaunimo tiesa (the Lithuanian edition of Komsomolskaya Pravda) in 1989. Film languages are Lithuanian and Russian. The name of the film refers to an episode when Marija pretends to be a Russian girl strayed from an excursion.

Awards
2014   (Lithuanian Film Awards)
Wins: best screenplay (Pranas Morkus), best actress (Anastasija Marčenkaitė), best cameraman
 Nominations: best film, best director, best supporting actor (Igor Savochkin), best supporting actress (Raisa Ryazanova)
2014 Nika Awards, Best Film of the CIS and Baltics; tied with Haytarma 
2014: Special award at the 44th international children's and youth film festival "Giffoni", Italy

References

External links

Film trailer, YouTube

Lithuanian drama films
Lithuanian-language films
2010s Russian-language films
2013 drama films
Occupation of the Baltic states